Pooja Sihag (born 17 July 1997) is an Indian freestyle wrestler. She won one of the bronze medals in the women's 76 kg event at the 2022 Commonwealth Games held in Birmingham, England.

Career 

In 2017, she competed in the women's 75 kg event at the World Wrestling Championships held in Paris, France. In 2019, she won the silver medal in the women's 76kg event at the Asian U23 Wrestling Championship held in Ulaanbaatar, Mongolia. In that same year, she also competed at the 2019 Asian Wrestling Championships held in Xi'an, China.

In April 2021, she competed at the Asian Olympic Qualification Tournament hoping to qualify for the 2020 Summer Olympics in Tokyo, Japan. She did not qualify for the Olympics at this tournament. In the same month, she won the bronze medal in her event at the 2021 Asian Wrestling Championships held in the same venue as the Asian Olympic Qualification Tournament. She also failed to qualify for the Olympics at the World Olympic Qualification Tournament held in Sofia, Bulgaria.

She won one of the bronze medals in the women's 76 kg event at the 2022 Commonwealth Games held in Birmingham, England.

Achievements

References

External links 
 

1997 births
Living people
Asian Wrestling Championships medalists
Commonwealth Games bronze medallists for India
Commonwealth Games medallists in wrestling
Wrestlers at the 2022 Commonwealth Games
21st-century Indian women
Medallists at the 2022 Commonwealth Games